The Infocomm Media Development Authority (IMDA) is a statutory board under the Singapore Ministry of Communications and Information (MCI).

History 
Following the passing of the Info-communications Media Development Authority Bill in Parliament on 16 August 2016, IMDA was launched on 30 September that year. This was preceded by the restructuring and merger of the Infocomm Development Authority (IDA) and the Media Development Authority (MDA).

Key Functions
IMDA provides numerous programmes, policies and grants that cater to industries and communities. IMDA also protects consumers' privacy through the Personal Data Protection Commission (PDPC).

Key Initiatives

 SMEs Go Digital — A programme that gives businesses pre-approved digital solutions and assist them in digitalising their business.
 Digital Economy Framework for Action — Aims to sharpen Singapore's digital edge by accelerating the digitalisation of industries and businesses, improve international competitiveness, and transform the infocomm and media sector via frontier technology.
 Services 4.0 — An initiative offering programmes to help businesses meet a new services industry that is enabled by emerging technology. Some programmes include GoCloud for ICT SMEs, PIXEL and Digital Services Laboratory (DSL).
 Digital Readiness — An initiative providing programmes that help Singaporeans use technology actively, responsibly and confidently.
TechSkills Accelerator (TeSA) — A collaborative initiative with SkillsFuture Singapore that aims to prepare the Singapore workforce for the digital economy. It offers programmes and grants that help professionals build and develop relevant ICT skills.
SG Women In Tech — An initiative to attract, retain and develop women talent across a diversity of jobs in the technology workforce.

See also
 Government Technology Agency (GovTech)
 Cyber Security Agency (Singapore)
SG100WIT 2021 List

References

Internet in Singapore
Statutory boards of the Singapore Government
2016 establishments in Singapore
Government agencies established in 2016
Telecommunications regulatory authorities
Communications authorities
Regulation in Singapore